R. G. Jadhav (August 24, 1932 – May 27, 2016) was a Marathi literary critic from Maharashtra, India.

For some years, he served as a professor of Marathi literature, first in a college in Amravati, then in Elphinstone College in Mumbai, and lastly in Milind College in Aurangabad. During 2001-02, he served as the chairman and chief editor of Vishwakosh. One of his written lessons, "shaal", is published in 10th Marathi textbook. He is a renowned writer.

Jadhav presided over Marathi Sahitya Sammelan at Aurangabad in 2004.

References
 
 संमेलनाध्यक्ष प्रा. रा.ग.जाधव (ग्रंथ; लेखक/संपादक : अरुण पारगावकर)

Marathi-language writers
1932 births
2016 deaths
Presidents of the Akhil Bharatiya Marathi Sahitya Sammelan